The following are the records of Palestine in Olympic weightlifting. Records are maintained in each weight class for the snatch lift, clean and jerk lift, and the total for both lifts by the Palestinian Weightlifting Federation (PWF).

Men

Women

References

External links
PWF web site

Palestine
Olympic weightlifting